Fânzeres is a town and a former civil parish in the municipality of Gondomar, Portugal. In 2013, the parish merged into the new parish Fânzeres e São Pedro da Cova. Its population is around 20,000.

References

Towns in Portugal
Former parishes of Gondomar, Portugal